The Ahmet Hamdi Tanpınar Literature Museum Library is a literary museum and archive dedicated to Turkish literature and named after the Turkish novelist and essayist Ahmet Hamdi Tanpınar (1901–1962). Located in Istanbul, Turkey, the museum was established by the Ministry of Culture and Tourism and opened on November 12, 2011.

The museum is housed in the two-storey Procession Kiosk, a 19th-century historic building on the outer walls of Gülhane Park that belongs to Topkapı Palace. It was used by the Ottoman sultans to accept salute of janissary soldiers parading as well as a pleasure locale. The building is situated across the Sublime Porte. It was used from the 1910s on as the center of the Fine Arts Association. From 1928 to the end 1930s, it served as a meeting place of an association dedicated to Turkish language and literature.

On the ground floor, there are two rooms and an entrance hall. The first floor houses the former throne room, in addition to two halls and three rooms. The ground floor is designed as a cafeteria, called the "Writers' Café", where prize-winning literary works are exhibited. Special corners on the upper floor are dedicated to the life and works of around 50 renowned authors native to Istanbul, with busts of some, including Nedîm (1681–1730), Yahya Kemal Beyatlı (1884–1958), Nâzım Hikmet Ran (1902–1963), Necip Fazıl Kısakürek (1904–1983), Aziz Nesin (1915–1995), Orhan Pamuk (born 1952), Ayşe Kulin (born 1941), Zülfü Livaneli (born 1946) and Doğan Hızlan (born 1937) in addition to Tanpınar. It is also a place for discussions on various authors, poetry performances, literature award ceremonies, and writing workshops. The library of the museum accommodates over 8,000 books, including about 1,000 books on Istanbul as well as volumes of more than 100 periodicals on literature and other fields of the arts. The museum hosts also temporary art exhibitions. It is the fourth of its kind in Turkey after the literature museums in Ankara, Adana and Diyarbakır.

The museum library is accessible by the public transport line Tram T1 (Kabataş–Bağcılar), and is open on weekdays between 10:00 and 19:00 local time. One enters the museum by climbing a ramp inside the Gülhane park walls.

Gallery

Gallery

See also
 Ahmet Arif Literature Museum Library, Diyarbakır
 Mehmet Akif Literature Museum Library, Ankara

References

Museums in Istanbul
Museums established in 2011
2011 establishments in Turkey
Literary museums in Turkey
Libraries in Istanbul
Literary archives in Turkey
Topkapı Palace
Fatih